Charles Francis Collins (September 13, 1885 – September 7, 1914) was an American football coach. He served as the head football coach at St. Bonaventure University in Allegany, New York.

References

External links
 

1885 births
1914 deaths
St. Bonaventure Brown Indians football coaches
People from Cameron County, Pennsylvania